Released in 2001 on Deep Shag Records, Lunch with the Devil is the sixth studio album from American artist Fish Karma. The album includes the songs "Poodlecide", as well as a tribute to 1980s metal icon Ronnie James Dio ("Dio Rocks!"), and a ballad of lust ("The Thighs of Tammy Faye"). The album marks the first official release of "Woke Up Dis Mornin'", which had been featured previously on the Dr. Demento Radio Show. The album includes many genres, such as cowpunk and freakout folk and is known for its comedic edge mixed with social or political commentary.

Track listing
"Poodlecide"
"Down to the Valley"
"Thighs of Tammy Faye"
"Should I Shop or Should I Die"
"God Is a Groovy Guy"
"Mogollon Love"
"Grenada"
"Dio Rocks!"
"Die Like a Dog"
"Mr. Johnson"
"Cow of My Dreams"
"An Artist's Lament"
"Chicken Lips"
"Woke Up Dis Mornin'"
"Have a Nice Day"
"White Things"

External links
Deep Shag Records listing for the album

2001 albums
Fish Karma albums
Deep Shag Records albums
2000s comedy albums